“Haï” is an essay written  by French Nobel laureate J. M. G. Le Clézio.

Subject
Recurrent images are the sun and the sea, light and water. From 1969 to 1973 Le Clézio lived among the Emberá speaking Indians in Panama.

Quote

Explanation of "Haï"
Haï could br translated from French into English as Chai. Chai is a symbol and word that figures prominently in Jewish culture and consists of the letters of the Hebrew alphabet Het (ח) and Yod (י)

Publication history

First

1971, France,Editions d'art Albert Skira,Les Sentiers de la création, Geneva

Reprint
It was reprinted by  Flammarion, Paris in 1987.

References

1971 essays
Essays by J. M. G. Le Clézio
Works by J. M. G. Le Clézio